Richard Michael Barroilhet (born 29 August 1992) is a professional footballer who plays as a forward. Born in England, he represented France at youth international level.

Club career
Born in Westminster, England, but grew up in France, Barroilhet joined Nice, where he came through the youth system and after two years at the club, Barroilhet went to England, where he was invited to join Fulham youth system.

He was offered his first professional contract at Fulham and following injury he went on loan to Finnish side VPS to get some game time.

In July 2012, Barroilhet moved to RKC Waalwijk in the Eredivisie. After injury and treatment during 2013, Barroilhet joined Nuneaton Town in November 2013. Just 25 days after signing for Nuneaton Town, Barroilhet left the club. 
Barroilhet went on trial with FC Taraz of the Kazakhstan Premier League in January 2014, going on to sign for the club in March of the same year. In May, the Dutch manager Arno Piipers, who took some players including Barroilhet to Taraz for his project, was dismissed. At the beginning of June, following changes in management, conditions, playing time, Barroilhet negotiated a mutual release. Following play time in Fréjus Saint-Raphaël in France and Utrecht-based Magreb '90 side in the Netherlands, Barroilhet joined the reserves of Montpellier HSC.

In July 2017, Barroilhet joined Chilean Primera División side O'Higgins. In January 2020, after three loans spells, the forward joined Primera B de Chile side Deportes Temuco on a permanent deal.

International career
Barroilet was born in England to a Chilean father and English mother, and moved to France at a young age. Barroilhet has three caps for the France U-19 team.

Personal life
He has two relatives who are professional footballers: his younger brother, Jordan, who came to Chile on 2020 to join Deportes Puerto Montt and his Chilean cousin Clemente Montes Barroilhet, who began his career playing for Universidad Católica.

Career statistics

References

External links

 Voetbal International

1992 births
Living people
Footballers from Westminster
French footballers
France youth international footballers
English footballers
Sportspeople of Chilean descent
French people of Chilean descent
English people of Chilean descent
English emigrants to France
Association football forwards
Fulham F.C. players
Vaasan Palloseura players
RKC Waalwijk players
Nuneaton Borough F.C. players
FC Taraz players
ÉFC Fréjus Saint-Raphaël players
O'Higgins F.C. footballers
A.C. Barnechea footballers
Deportes Magallanes footballers
Puerto Montt footballers
Deportes Temuco footballers
Universidad de Concepción footballers
Veikkausliiga players
National League (English football) players
Kazakhstan Premier League players
Championnat National players
Primera B de Chile players
Expatriate footballers in Finland
Expatriate footballers in the Netherlands
Expatriate footballers in Kazakhstan